Sporopodiopsis is a genus of two species of lichenized fungi in the family Pilocarpaceae.

References

Pilocarpaceae
Lichen genera
Lecanorales genera
Taxa described in 1997
Taxa named by Emmanuël Sérusiaux